Pernilla is a Swedish female given name derived from Petronella, and may refer to:

 Pernilla Andersson (born 1969), Swedish singer and songwriter 
 Pernilla August (born 1969), Swedish actress
 Anna Pernilla Backman (born 1969), Swedish composer, artist and singer known as Meja
 Pernilla Karlsson (born 1990), Swedo-Finnish singer who represented Finland in the Eurovision Song Contest 2012
 Pernilla Månsson Colt (born 1966), Swedish journalist and producer
 Pernilla Stålhammar (born 1971), Swedish politician
 Pernilla Wiberg (born 1970), Swedish former alpine ski racer and winner of two Olympic gold medals

See also

 Pernille, the corresponding Danish and Norwegian name

Swedish feminine given names